Scratch My Arse Rock, (also known as Kiss Me Arse Rock), is a popular fishing location off the coast of Palmerston Island, an atoll belonging to the Cook Islands archipelago. The rock's name was reputedly conferred by William Marsters,  the 19th-century progenitor of the Marsters family, which continues to inhabit and administer Palmerston Island today. The waters off Scratch My Arse Rock are noted for their abundance of parrotfish.

Geographical data for the rock is available from the National Geospatial-Intelligence Agency at Bethesda, Maryland, United States, to be found at Geographical Names.

References

External links
Scratch My Arse Rock, Cook Islands

Landforms of the Cook Islands
Palmerston Island
Rock formations of Oceania